The 2003 NCAA Division III football season, part of the college football season organized by the NCAA at the Division III level in the United States, began in August 2003, and concluded with the NCAA Division III Football Championship, also known as the Stagg Bowl, in December 2003 at Salem Football Stadium in Salem, Virginia. The Saint John's (MN) Johnnies won second Division III championship by defeating the three-time defending national champion Mount Union Purple Raiders, 24−6.

The Gagliardi Trophy, given to the most outstanding player in Division III football, was awarded to Blake Elliott, wide receiver, punter, and kick returner from Saint John's (MN).

Conference changes and new programs

Conference standings

Conference champions

Postseason
The 2003 NCAA Division III Football Championship playoffs were the 31st annual single-elimination tournament to determine the national champion of men's NCAA Division III college football. The championship Stagg Bowl game was held at Salem Football Stadium in Salem, Virginia for the 11th time. This was the fifth bracket to feature 28 teams since last expanding in 1999.

Playoff bracket

* Overtime

Final D3football.com Poll

Others receiving votes: 26. Capital 50, 27. Hardin-SImmons 47, 28. Allegheny 42, 29. Trinity(Conn.) 38, 30. Redlands 22, 31. Hope 21, 32. UW-Whitewater 19, 32. Hanover 19, 34. Curry 18, 35. Concordia(Wis.) 16, 36. Washington and Jefferson 12, 37. Muhlenberg 9, 38. Rowan 7, 38. Augustana 7, 40. Delaware Valley 6, 41. Menlo 3, 42. Willamette 2, 43. New Jersey 1, 43. Shenandoah 1.

Awards
Gagliardi Trophy: Blake Elliott

AFCA Coach of the Year: John Gagliardi

AFCA Regional Coach of the Year: Region 1: Mike DeLong, Springfield College Region 2: Jeff Hand, Waynesburg College Region 3: Ralph Harris, East Texas Baptist University Region 4: Mike Swider, Wheaton College Region 5: John Gagliardi, St. John’s University (Minn.)

See also
2003 NCAA Division I-A football season
2003 NCAA Division I-AA football season
2003 NCAA Division II football season

References